The Piano Concerto No. 14 in E major, K. 449, by Wolfgang Amadeus Mozart was written in 1784.

History 
It is the first composition he entered into a notebook of his music he then kept for the next seven years, marking down main themes, dates of completion, and other important information. From this notebook we have the information that he completed the concerto on February 9, 1784.

In the same year, he wrote several concertos in succession, and in a letter to his father that May, wrote of the 15th and 16th concertos (K. 450 and 451) that he "could not choose between them" but that "the one in E flat [No. 14] does not belong at all to the same category. It is one of a quite peculiar kind...". The 14th is regarded as being the first of the mature series of concertos Mozart wrote, and indeed, commentators such as Girdlestone and Hutchings valued it as one of the best, particularly as all three movements are of the highest standard.

Structure

The concerto is scored for 2 oboes, 2 horns and strings.

The concerto has three movements:

Works written in 1784 include, besides this concerto, the five piano concertos 15–19,  the Quintet in E for Piano and Winds, and several piano works – the Sonata in C minor being the most noteworthy—one string quartet (the "Hunt"), and several sets of orchestral dances. Works by other composers who were known to Mozart from around this time include the 80th symphony (in D minor) and second cello concerto of Joseph Haydn. Michael Haydn had published two sets of quartets the year before, and Carl Stamitz and Ignaz Pleyel each wrote another set of six quartets (Pleyel released a further set in 1784.) A Pleyel cello concerto (in C) was also released at some point between 1782–84 (Pleyel being a composer whose quartets, at least, Mozart rated highly.)

I. Allegro vivace

The first movement begins in a  time signature, an unusual feature among Mozart's 27 piano concertos. It is also traditional, in the tutti of a classical concerto, for there to be little key adventuring. There are several reasons for this, but the upshot is that, the less this is true, the harder it becomes to distinguish the tutti from the opening of a classical-era symphony.

The first phrase of this concerto begins ambiguously. A unison E followed by a C, then a G, is followed by the dominant chord's leading tone (A) trilled up to the dominant, B. It's interesting that this progression seems to suggest a dominant cadence in the dominant key of B. In other words, Cmin to F to B (ii – V – I in B). There is an immediate modulation, through a fiery C-minor passage, into B major. Here a possible second theme is heard, played by strings, winds not coming in until its later strain (near the modulation back into E).

Also interesting about this concerto is that the first movement ventures off from the normal conception of the concerto. Usually, when it comes time for the cadenza at the end of the recapitulation, the soloists will have a cadential trill on the tonic after which the orchestra will play part of the ritornello leading to the I 6/4 at which point the soloists performs the cadenza.  However, instead of the trill being accompanied by strings, it is interrupted by them on the second beat and ends up resolving to c minor.  Shortly thereafter, however, the I arrives and the cadenza begins and everything continues on as normal.

III. Allegro ma non troppo
Girdlestone (p 187, Mozart and his Piano Concertos) writes that the gait of this finale is "neither that of a gallop, nor of a race, nor even of a dance, but just of a swinging walk, swift and regular, and the virtue of its refrain, with its sketchy outline and its 'sillabato' diction... rests in its rhythm rather than in its melody." Further, he notes that while this rondo can be divided into contrasting sections, the appearance on the page is very different from what falls on the ear, which is almost monothematic: "When, score in hand, one notes each return of the first subject... it is possible to pick out the four expositions of the [rondo] refrain and the three couplets... but on hearing it one's impression is that the refrain never leaves the stage".

References
Einstein, Alfred. Mozart: His Character, His Work. London: Oxford University Press. First Edition: 1945. Translated from the German by Arthur Mendel and Nathan Broder. p. 301.
Girdlestone, Cuthbert Morton. Mozart and his Piano Concertos. New York: Dover Publications. 1964. "Unabridged and uncorrected republication of the second (1958) edition of the work first published in 1948 by Cassell & Company, Ltd., London, under the title Mozart's Piano Concertos." . Esp. pp. 174–192.
 (notes that the opening movement was begun in 1782)
Mozart, Wolfgang Amadeus. Piano Concertos Nos. 11-16  New York: Dover Publications. 1987. . pp. 105–140. Contains the score of the concerto.

External links
 

Performance of Piano Concerto No. 14 by the Chamber Music Society of Lincoln Center from the Isabella Stewart Gardner Museum in MP3 format

14
Compositions in E-flat major
1784 compositions